Araku railway station (station code:ARK) is an Indian railways station located near Araku Valley of Alluri Sitharama Raju district in the state of Andhra Pradesh. It belongs to South Coast Railway zone under Vishakapatnam railway division. The railway station is situated at about 935 meters elevation.

History
In 1960, Indian Railway took up three projects: the Kothavalasa–Araku–Koraput–Jeypore–Jagdalpur–Dantewara–Kirandaul line, the Jharsuguda–Sambalpur–Bargarh–Balangir–Titlagarh Project and the Biramitrapur–Rourkela–Bimlagarh–Kiriburu project. All the three projects taken together were popularly known as the DBK Project or the Dandakaranya–Bolangir–Kiriburu project (under Dandakaranya Project ). The Kothavalasa–Kirandul line was opened in 1966–67 under South Eastern Railway Zone with financial aid of Japan for transporting Iron ore.

Electrification of the Araku railway station was completed in 1982

See also
 Borra Caves
 Visakhapatnam–Araku AC Tourist Passenger
 Araku Valley

References

External links
 

Railway stations in Visakhapatnam
Railway stations in Waltair railway division